The Kota–Hazrat Nizamuddin Jan Shatabdi Express is a Superfast Express train of the Jan Shatabdi Express category belonging to West Central Railway zone that runs between  and  in India.

It operates as train number 12059 from Kota Junction to Hazrat Nizamuddin and as train number 12060 in the reverse direction, serving the states of Rajasthan, Uttar Pradesh, Haryana & Delhi.

Stoppage
Its stops are Kota Junction, Sawai Madhopur, Gangapur city, Hindaun City, Bayana, Bharatpur, Mathura, Ballabhgarh and finally Hazrat Nizamuddin.

Timing
It departs from Kota at 6.15 AM and reaches Hazrat Nizamuddin at 12.10 PM. On return it departs Hazrat Nizamuddin at 12.45 PM and reaches Kota at 6.55 Pm

Traction
It is hauled by a Tughlakabad Electric Loco Shed-based WAP-7 locomotive from end to end.

External links

Jan Shatabdi Express trains
Rail transport in Rajasthan
Rail transport in Haryana
Rail transport in Delhi
Transport in Kota, Rajasthan
Transport in Delhi